The 1993–94 Iowa State Cyclones men's basketball team represented Iowa State University during the 1993–94 NCAA Division I men's basketball season. The Cyclones were coached by Johnny Orr, who was in his 14th season. They played their home games at Hilton Coliseum in Ames, Iowa. It would be Orr's final season as head coach. Tim Floyd would take over the program the following season.

They finished the season 14–13, 4–10 in Big Eight play to finish tied for sixth place. Their 23 wins were a school record at the time.  They lost to Oklahoma State in the 1994 Big Eight conference tournament championship. They did not qualify for postseason play.

Games were televised by ESPN, Raycom Sports and the Cyclone Television Network.

Previous season 
The previous season the Cyclones finished the season 20–11, 8–6 in Big Eight play to finish tied for second place.  They defeated Oklahoma in the 1993 Big Eight conference tournament quarterfinals before losing to Missouri, 67–63. They would qualify for the 1992-93 NCAA men's basketball tournament, losing to UCLA in the first round, 81–70.

Roster

Schedule and results 

|-
!colspan=6 style=""|Exhibition

|-

|-
|-
!colspan=6 style=""|Regular Season

|-

|-

|-

|-

|-

|-

|-

|-

|-

|-

|-

|-

|-

|-

|-

|-

|-

|-

|-

|-

|-

|-

|-

|-

|-

|-
!colspan=12 style=""|Big Eight tournament

Awards and honors 

*Academic All-Americans

Fred Hoiberg (Second Team)
Julius Michalik (Third Team)

All-Big Eight Selections

Fred Hoiberg (Second Team)
Julius Michalik (HM)

*Academic All-Big Eight

Marc Carlson
Fred Hoiberg
Julius Michalik

Ralph Olsen Award

Fred Hoiberg

References 

Iowa State Cyclones men's basketball seasons
Iowa State
Iowa State Cyc
Iowa State Cyc